Alfons Van den Brande (15 February 1928 – 23 April 2016) was a Belgian professional racing cyclist. He rode in the 1954 Tour de France and finished third in the 1954 Tour of Flanders.

References

External links
 

1928 births
2016 deaths
Belgian male cyclists
Cyclists from Antwerp Province
People from Nijlen